The IIHF European Champions Cup (ECC) was an annual event organized by the International Ice Hockey Federation (IIHF), which took place during a long weekend in early January. The winner was considered the official club champion of Europe by the IIHF. The Champions Cup was first played in 2005, as a replacement for the defunct European Cup (1965–1997), and the suspended European Hockey League (1996–2000).  In the 2008–09 season, the ECC was replaced by the Champions Hockey League, which was the new official European club championship event. The new tournament was cancelled after only one season. However, another tournament with the same name was introduced in 2014.

Format

The competition featured the reigning club champions from the top six European hockey nations according to the IIHF World Ranking; these teams were known as the Super Six. Two groups of three played in a round-robin tournament, with the winners of each group facing off in a championship game. The two groups were named after international hockey legends Alexander Ragulin and Ivan Hlinka.

ECC winners (2005–2008)

Participants and results (2005–2008)

2005 results
Group A
  Dukla Trenčín –  Avangard Omsk – 1:6 (1:3; 0:1; 0:2)
  HV71 –  Dukla Trenčín – 4:1 (3:0; 0:0; 1:1)
  Avangard Omsk –  HV71 – 9:0 (4:0; 2:0; 3:0)

Group B
  HC Hamé Zlín –  Frankfurt Lions – 4:3 (2:2; 0:1; 2:0)
  Kärpät –  HC Hamé Zlín – 4:1 (1:0; 2:1; 1:0)
  Frankfurt Lions –  Kärpät – 3:6 (1:3; 0:2; 2:1)

Final

  Avangard Omsk –  Kärpät – 2:1 (OT) (0:1; 0:0; 1:0; 1:0)

2006 results
Alexander Ragulin division
  HC Dynamo Moscow –  HC Slovan Bratislava – 3:1 (2:0; 0:0; 1:1)
  HC Slovan Bratislava –  HC Moeller-Pardubice – 0:2 (0:0; 0:2; 0:0)
  HC Moeller-Pardubice –  HC Dynamo Moscow – 1:5 (1:3; 0:0; 0:2)

Ivan Hlinka division
  Kärpät –  HC Davos – 3:1 (1:0; 0:1; 2:0)
  HC Davos –  Frölunda HC – 6:2 (2:0; 2:1; 2:1)
  Frölunda HC –  Kärpät – 0:3 (0:1; 0:1; 0:1)

Final
  HC Dynamo Moscow –  Kärpät – 5:4 (in a shootout) (1:0; 1:2; 2:2; 0:0; 2:1)

2007 results
Alexander Ragulin division
  HPK –  MsHK Žilina – 7:0 (2:0; 3:0; 2:0)
  MsHK Žilina –  HC Sparta Praha – 4:2 (0:1; 2:1; 2:0)
  HC Sparta Praha –  HPK – 2:3 (1:1; 1:2; 0:0)

Ivan Hlinka division
  Ak Bars Kazan –  Färjestad BK – 6:4 (2:2; 2:1; 2:1)
  Färjestad BK –  HC Lugano – 0:3 (0:1; 0:1; 0:1)
  HC Lugano –  Ak Bars Kazan – 0:3 (0:1; 0:1; 0:1)

Final
  HPK –  Ak Bars Kazan – 0:6 (0:3, 0:0, 0:3)

2008 results
Alexander Ragulin division
  Metallurg Magnitogorsk –  Modo Hockey – 3:0 (2:0; 1:0; 0:0)
  Modo Hockey –  HC Slovan Bratislava – 1:4 (1:0; 0:3; 0:1)
  HC Slovan Bratislava –  Metallurg Magnitogorsk – 1:2 (1:0; 0:0; 0:1; 0:0; 0:1)

Ivan Hlinka division
  Kärpät –  HC Sparta Praha – 3:5 (0:2; 1:2; 2:1)
  HC Sparta Praha –  HC Davos – 6:4 (1:2; 3:1; 2:1)
  HC Davos –  Kärpät – 1:6 (0:1; 1:3; 0:2)

Final
  HC Sparta Praha –  Metallurg Magnitogorsk – 2:5 (1:1; 1:2; 0:2)

Predecessors

European Cup (1965–1997)

The European Cup, also known as the Europa Cup, was a European ice hockey club competition for champions of national leagues which was contested between 1965 and 1997.

European Hockey League (1996–2000)

The European Hockey League was a European ice hockey club competition which ran between the years 1996 and 2000.

IIHF Continental Cup (1997–present)

The Continental Cup is an ice hockey tournament for European clubs, begun in 1997 after the discontinuing of the IIHF European Cup. It was intended for teams from countries without representatives in the European Hockey League, with participating teams chosen by the countries' respective ice hockey associations.

IIHF Super Cup (1997–2000)

The IIHF Super Cup was an ice hockey event played between the champions of the two main European club tournaments at the time; it began in 1997 and ended in 2000.

Successors

IIHF Champions Hockey League (2008–2009)

The Champions Hockey League was conducted by 14 teams of which 12 are in the group stage. It replaced the IIHF European Champions Cup in 2008. The league was staged for one year only.

Champions Hockey League (2014–present)

On December 9, 2013, the IIHF officially announced that they had launched a new tournament with a similar name as their previous tournament, born out of the European Trophy, starting in the 2014–15 season.

See also
Champions Hockey League
Champions Hockey League (2008–09)
IIHF Continental Cup
IIHF Super Cup
Spengler Cup
Ice Hockey European Championships
European Trophy

References

External links
IIHF Club Competition History on IIHF.com

 
European Champions Cup
International Ice Hockey Federation tournaments